The Georgia–Tennessee football rivalry is an American college football rivalry between the Georgia Bulldogs football team of the University of Georgia and Tennessee Volunteers football team of the University of Tennessee. The series is led by Georgia 27–23–2. Both teams are founding members of the Southeastern Conference (SEC). Tennessee and Georgia are the second and third winningest football programs in SEC history, behind only Alabama. The rivalry has never been contested anyplace besides Knoxville, Tennessee or Athens, Georgia, and alternates between the two respective campuses. Games in odd-numbered years are played in Knoxville, and even-numbered years in Athens.

Series history
From 1899 to 1989, UT and UGA met only 21 times before the Southeastern Conference (SEC) expanded to twelve members and split into two divisions of six members each, West and East. (The conference expanded by 2 members (Texas A&M and Missouri) in 2012; therefore the SEC West and East divisions have currently seven members each.) UGA held a 10–9–2 series lead in the rivalry before annual play began in 1992.  Since 1992, the Dawgs and Vols have both been in the SEC's Eastern Division and have met annually on the football field. The largest margin of victory overall was Tennessee by 46 points in 1936 at Sanford Stadium in Athens in their 46–0 victory. The largest margin of victory for Georgia is by 44 points in 1981 at Sanford Stadium in their 44–0 victory. The longest win streak for Georgia is 6, from 2017-2022. The longest win streak for Tennessee is 9 from 1989 to 1999.

Throughout the 1990s, Tennessee went 9–0 vs Georgia, holding a nine-game win streak. Georgia ended the streak in 2000 under head coach Jim Donnan when they defeated the Volunteers 21–10. In 2001, the Mark Richt era began at Georgia. He led the Bulldogs to wins against the Volunteers in his first three seasons, beginning with a memorable upset in Knoxville in 2001. In 2007, Tennessee defeated Georgia 35–14 to win the tie-breaker for the conference title game. In the 2009 game, the Vols defeated Georgia 45–19 under first and only season under Lane Kiffin. Georgia held a 6–4 advantage over the Volunteers in the 2000s.

In 2010, Derek Dooley became the Tennessee head coach. Throughout his tenure he went 0–3 vs Bulldogs, and Georgia extended a five-game winning streak against Tennessee. Georgia continued their streak until 2015 when Tennessee defeated the Bulldogs 38–31 in Knoxville, under head coach Butch Jones. From 2011 to 2016, every game in the series was decided by eight points or less, including one overtime thriller in 2013. In 2016 Kirby Smart succeeded Mark Richt as Georgia head coach. That year, Tennessee won by a Hail Mary pass with 4 seconds left on the clock. In the 2017 meeting, Georgia defeated Tennessee 41–0 in Knoxville, giving Tennessee its worst home loss since 1905. In 2018, Georgia defeated Tennessee 38–12 in Athens at Sanford Stadium in 2018.
Georgia's 2019 victory gave UGA the series lead for the first time since Tennessee had taken the lead in 1993. Georgia currently holds a 6 game win streak in the rivalry after their victory in the 2022 game.

Game results
Rankings are from the AP Poll.

Notable games
1899: On November 11, 1899, was the first meeting between Georgia and Tennessee. Both teams met at Waite Field  in Knoxville, TN. Tennessee defeated Georgia 5–0.
1973: In 1973, Georgia, who trailed 31–21, scored a touchdown in the final minutes as quarterback Andy Johnson ran into the end zone for an 8-yard score after the football bounced back into his hands after a botched handoff. The touchdown clinched the Georgia comeback 35–31.
1980: In 1980, Georgia, who trailed early 15–0, rallied back behind Herschel Walker, who, on his first collegiate touchdown, ran right over Tennessee defender Bill Bates. Georgia would go on to win 16–15, their first victory in an undefeated national championship season.
1992: In 1992, No. 20 Tennessee defeated No. 14 Georgia 34–31 to clinch a 2–0 start. This was the first meeting as SEC Eastern Division foes.
1995: In 1995, Georgia had the ball with under two minutes to play in a tie game, 27–27. Georgia then missed a potential game-winning field goal with just over a minute and a half left. Peyton Manning then took the Volunteers to within 40 yards, and Tennessee kicked the game-winning field goal with 10 seconds left to win their 5th game in a row against the Bulldogs, 30–27.
2000: In 2000, Georgia quarterback Quincy Carter beat the Volunteers 21–10 in Athens. The victory over Tennessee was Georgia's first win over the Vols since 1988, after 9 straight Tennessee wins. Fans stormed the field at Sanford Stadium in celebration for the only time in school history – taking down the goalposts. Larry Munson, Georgia's radio announcer, said "The athletic department is about to lose about $11,000...we won by 11 points and a lot of praying up here!"
2001: The Hobnail Boot Game: In the 2001 game, Tennessee was ranked No. 6 as it faced UGA coach Mark Richt for the first time. The lead was traded multiple times, but Tennessee had seemingly won the game on a 62-yard touchdown pass with only 44 seconds remaining to take a 24–20 lead. Georgia quarterback David Greene would take the Bulldogs down the field and threw a touchdown pass to Verron Haynes with 6 seconds left to upset Tennessee 26–24. Legendary Georgia radio announcer Larry Munson in a famous call exclaimed, "We just stepped on their face with a hobnail boot and broke their nose! We just crushed their face!". The Bulldog win snapped a five game losing streak in Neyland Stadium. 
2004: In 2004, No. 17 Tennessee ended the back to back SEC Eastern Division Champions 17-game home winning streak with a shocking upset, 19–14. The victory propelled the Volunteers to the SEC Eastern Division Championship, and knocked No. 3 UGA out of the national title. The Vols were a 12 point underdog and coming off a 34–10 loss to Auburn the week before. Tennessee took a 10–0 lead in the first quarter, and went to halftime with a 13–7 lead. Late of the third quarter, the Bulldogs attempted an unsuccessful fake a punt on a 4 and 3 , and Tennessee took advantage and took a 19–7 lead. The Bulldogs answered with a rushing touchdown to cut the lead to five. Towards the end of the game Georgia rushed to the Tennessee 19-yard, but time expired giving the Vols the 19–14 victory.Tennessee was the eventual SEC east champions, and lost in the SEC Championship game in a rematch against Auburn, 38–28.  

2007: In 2007, unranked Tennessee took an early lead over No. 12 Georgia in Knoxville early, en route to a 35–14 victory. Georgia and Tennessee would finish the season tied for the SEC Eastern Division, but Tennessee's head-to-head victory allowed the Vols to advance to Atlanta for the SEC Championship Game where they were defeated by LSU 21–14. The Bulldogs would finish the season ranked No. 2, the loss preventing them from advancing to the BCS National Championship Game, while Tennessee finished No. 14.
2013: In 2013, Georgia jumped to a 17–3 half time lead. In the third quarter of the game Tennessee came back by a block punt for a touchdown, and a couple of touchdowns. With 1:13 left in the game Tennessee scored a touchdown by Rajion Neal to make the score 31–24. With 5 seconds to go Georgia answered back, with Aaron Murray's pass complete to Rantavious Wooten. In overtime Tennessee thought they scored a touchdown, but after review, it was shown to be a fumble by Volunteer player, Pig Howard, causing a touchback and turning the ball over to the Bulldogs. After taking over at the 25 yard line, Georgia ran 3 plays for no yards and lined up for a 42 yard field goal by Marshall Morgan which was good and Georgia won the game 34–31.
2015: In 2015, the No. 19 Georgia Bulldogs traveled to Knoxville looking to extend a 5-year winning streak over the Volunteers, but coming off a disheartening 38–10 loss to Alabama at home. After the Bulldogs took a 24–3 lead, the Volunteers scored a touchdown and recovered a fumble on the ensuing kickoff with 3 minutes left until halftime, leading to another Tennessee score. Tennessee took control of the game in the second half outscoring Georgia 21–7. Georgia was rallying late in the 4th quarter down 38–31 when Greyson Lambert launched a long pass right into the waiting arms of wide receiver Reggie Davis only for Davis to drop the game-tying touchdown. The unranked Tennessee Volunteers would hold on and give Coach Butch Jones one of the biggest wins of his career, beating the No. 19 Bulldogs 38–31, and snapping a five-game losing streak. The game would prove costly to Mark Richt. Even though Georgia's only other loss after would be to eventual SEC East champion Florida, Richt would be dismissed as head coach at season's end.
2016: The No.25 Bulldogs stormed to a 17–0 lead in the second quarter, but the No. 11 Vols rallied to take their first lead of the game at 28–24 late in the fourth quarter when Georgia quarterback Jacob Eason was sacked and fumbled the ball in the endzone. After an Eason interception and Vols punt, the Bulldogs found themselves at the Vols' 47-yard line with 19 seconds to go. Out of timeouts, Eason launched a deep touchdown pass to receiver Riley Ridley and Georgia regained the lead at 31–28 with 10 seconds left in regulation. However, the Bulldogs were whistled for an unsportsmanlike conduct penalty after the score and were forced to kickoff from their own 20-yard line. After another Georgia penalty,  Quarterback Joshua Dobbs heaved a long Hail Mary pass from the Bulldogs' 43-yard line to receiver Jauan Jennings, who caught the pass in the end zone, leading the undefeated Volunteers to the 34–31 win.
 2017: The undefeated Georgia Bulldogs entered Knoxville, TN seeking revenge for the previous year's defeat by the Tennessee Volunteers. Georgia's Ty McGhee intercepted the first pass of the game as Georgia had a 41–0 victory that doubled as Tennessee's worst home loss in over 100 years, and first shutout since 1994. Georgia QB Jake Fromm had 3 total touchdowns, including a TD pass to Javon Wims and 2 rushing TDs. Georgia controlled the game with running backs Sony Michel, Nick Chubb, and D'Andre Swift.
 2022: "Nowhere to Run; Nowhere to Hide": The AP-top-ranked Georgia Bulldogs took on the AP-second-ranked (tied with Ohio State) and CFP-top-ranked Tennessee Volunteers. The Volunteers came into the game averaging 49.5 points per game. Georgia's Kirby Smart had themed UGA's defensive preparations for the Volunteers as "Nowhere to Run; Nowhere to Hide".  Georgia would win in a one-sided game 27-13. Both teams had entered the game undefeated and tied for first place in the SEC East, with Georgia, the winner, going to win the 2022 SEC Championship Game and 2023 College Football Playoff National Championship.

See also  
 List of NCAA college football rivalry games

References

College football rivalries in the United States
Georgia Bulldogs football
Tennessee Volunteers football